St Patrick's Cathedral, Parramatta is the Catholic cathedral church of the Diocese of Parramatta and the seat and residence of the Catholic Bishop of Parramatta, New South Wales, Australia, currently the Most Reverend Vincent Long Van Nguyen OFM Conv.

History
With origins of the first Mass occurring on the present day site of the cathedral going back to 1803, St Patrick's was extensively rebuilt after a 1996 fire devastated the original church established in 1854. A tower was built on the original St Patrick's Church which was consecrated in 1880 and blessed in 1883. A cast bronze bell was installed in the tower in 1904. As the needs of the parish grew, a new church was built on the site in 1936 incorporating the existing tower and spire (pictured above). When the Diocese of Parramatta was established in 1986, St Patrick's Church was designated as St Patrick's Cathedral.

Building design and works
Under Bishop Kevin Manning and dean Peter G. Williams, the building was designed by Romaldo Giurgola and the firm MGT Architects. Giurgola was commissioned in 1997 for the restoration and design of a new cathedral complex after a fire destroyed the previous building. Giurgola was the architect of the new Australian Parliament House in Canberra.

A program of major art works, craft and special design for the cathedral was also undertaken at the same time so that the art, architecture and furnishings of the new cathedral would be in harmony. The commissioned artists included Sydney sculptor Anne Ferguson (who worked in stone), Tasmanian designer Kevin Perkins (who worked in timber) and Sydney sculptor and jewellery designer Robin Blau (who worked in metal). The new Parramatta Cathedral was consecrated on 29 November 2003 by Cardinal Edward Idris Clancy.

The Norman and Beard late-Victorian English romantic pipe organ, built in 1898, was installed in 2006. This 19th-century organ was transferred from St Saviour's Anglican Church in Knightsbridge, London. Stephen Bicknell designed a new organ case in collaboration with Romaldo Giurgola and the instrument was restored and installed in Parramatta Cathedral by Peter Jewkes and Associates. The organ specifications were further enhanced in 2014 with the addition of several digital ranks of pedal pipes, including 32' Contra-Bourdon, 32' Contra-ophicleide, 16' Major bass; and additional switching devices for the transfer of swell reeds to pedal.

The building design and construction team were awarded the 2003 Sir Zelman Cowen Award for Public Buildings by the Australian Institute of Architects.

References

External links
Diocese of Parramatta website
 Link to the cathedral pipe organ specifications

See also
St Patrick's Cemetery, North Parramatta

Roman Catholic cathedrals in New South Wales
Parramatta
Churches destroyed by arson
Roman Catholic Diocese of Parramatta
19th-century Roman Catholic church buildings in Australia
20th-century Roman Catholic church buildings in Australia